Athletic Football Club Eskilstuna, also known as AFC Eskilstuna or simply AFC, is a Swedish football club located in Eskilstuna. The club has previously been known under the names FC Café Opera and Väsby United before switching ownership and their identity again in 2012 to AFC United. During the 2016 season it was once again decided that they would switch their name, identity, as well as locality. Choosing to move to Eskilstuna, about 110 kilometers west of Stockholm, they are since known as AFC Eskilstuna. They compete in Superettan, the second highest tier of Swedish football, and play their home matches at Tunavallen. AFC Eskilstuna are affiliated to Södermanlands Fotbollförbund.

Background

FC Café Opera
FC Café Opera was created in 1991 by Italian born restauranteer Alessandro Catenacci who named the club after Café Opera which he owned. They started out in division 8 of the Swedish football league system but only nine years later they had made it to the second tier Superettan.

Väsby United
Football Club Väsby United was formed in 2005 when the two Stockholm clubs FC Café Opera United and Väsby IK FK merged. The new club replaced FC Café Opera United in the Superettan making it the youngest club competing at this level. Väsby United was a feeder club to AIK who participated in the second and third divisions of the Swedish football league system.  The club played in Division 1 Norra which is the third tier of Swedish football when they became AFC United.

AFC United
AFC United was founded when FC Väsby United increased their cooperation Division 3 club Athletic FC in late 2012. They played their home matches at Skytteholms IP in Solna until the end of the 2016 season. Athletic FC was founded in 2007 and defunct in 2012, they then became part of AFC United, the club that later became known as AFC Eskilstuna.

In 2012, Athletic FC played in Swedish football Division 3 Norra Svealand which is the fifth tier of Swedish football. They played their home matches at the Skytteholms IP in Solna.

The club was affiliated to Stockholms Fotbollförbund.

AFC Eskilstuna
During the 2016 season the club management decided to uproot and leave Solna and move to Eskilstuna and Tunavallen before the 2017 season. They also changed their name to AFC Eskilstuna.

The team were winless, having only acquired 4 points from the opening 12 matches and were firmly rooted to the bottom of the league table. Michael Jolley was announced as new manager on 13 June 2017. Under Jolley's coaching they took 15 points from the next 16 games. A 3–1 victory over Malmö FF on 19 August 2017 in particular provided the biggest shock of the season in Allsvenskan. However, they were eventually relegated to Superettan on 23 October 2017 following a spirited fight when Jönköpings Södra IF defeated Kalmar FF 2–0, meaning AFC Eskilstuna could no longer reach the qualifying position. Jolley departed ways with AFC Eskilstuna on 9 January 2018 by mutual consent, after being unable to agree on the future direction of the club.

On 15 January 2018, Nemanja Miljanović became the manager, after their relegation to the Superettan.

Season-to-season

Players

Current squad

Attendances
Väsby United had the following average attendances:

In recent seasons AFC United have had the following average attendances:

The highest attendance for FC Väsby United at Råsunda was 8,672 spectators who attended the match with AIK on 15 August 2005.

Achievements

League
 Superettan:
 Runners-up (1): 2016
 Division 1 Norra:
 Winners (1): 2014
 Runners-up (2): 2007, 2011

Cup
 Svenska Cupen
 Runners-up (1): 2019

Notes and references

Notes

References

External links

 

 
Allsvenskan clubs
2007 establishments in Sweden
Association football clubs established in 2007
Football clubs in Södermanland County